The 119th New York Infantry Regiment was an infantry regiment in the Union Army during the American Civil War.

Service
The 119th New York Infantry was organized at New York City, New York beginning June 26, 1862 and mustered in for three years service on September 4, 1862 under the command of Colonel Elias Peissner.

The regiment was attached to 2nd Brigade, 3rd Division, XI Corps, Army of the Potomac, to October 1863, and Army of the Cumberland to April 1864. 2nd Brigade, 2nd Division, XX Corps, Army of the Cumberland, to June 1865.

The 119th New York Infantry mustered out of service June 8, 1865.  Recruits and veterans were transferred to the 102nd New York Volunteer Infantry.

Detailed service
Left New York for Washington, D.C., September 6, 1862. Duty in the defenses of Washington, D.C., until November 1862. Movement to Gainesville, Virginia, November 1–9, then to Centreville November 18, and to Falmouth December 9–16. At Stafford Court House until January 20, 1863. "Mud March", January 20–24. At Stafford Court House until April 27. Chancellorsville Campaign, April 27 – May 6. Battle of Chancellorsville May 1–5. Gettysburg Campaign, June 11 – July 24. Battle of Gettysburg, July 1–3. Pursuit of Lee to Manassas Gap, Virginia, July 5–24. Guard duty on Orange & Alexandria Railroad until September. Movement to Bridgeport, Alabama, September 24 – October 3. Duty there and in Lookout Valley until November 22. Reopening Tennessee River, October 26–29. Battle of Wauhatchie, Tennessee, October 28–29. Chattanooga-Ringgold Campaign, November 23–27. Orchard Knob, November 23. Tunnel Hill November 24–25. Missionary Ridge, November 25. March to relief of Knoxville, November 28 – December 17. Duty in Alabama until April 1864. Atlanta Campaign, May 1 – September 8. Operations against Rocky Faced Ridge, May 8–11. Mill Creek or Dug Gap, May 8. Battle of Resaca, May 14–15. Near Cassville, May 19. New Hope Church, May 25. Battles about Dallas, New Hope Church, and Allatoona Hills, May 26 – June 5. Operations about Marietta and against Kennesaw Mountain, June 10 – July 2. Pine Hill, June 11–14. Lost Mountain, June 15–17. Gilgal or Golgotha Church, June 15. Muddy Creek, June 17. Noyes Creek, June 19. Kolk's Farm, June 22. Assault on Kennesaw, June 27. Ruff's Station, Smyrna Camp Ground, July 4. Chattahoochie River, July 5–17. Peachtree Creek, July 19–20. Siege of Atlanta, July 22–August 25. Operations at Chattahoochie River Bridge, August 26 – September 2. Occupation of Atlanta, September 2 to November 15. Expedition from Atlanta to Tuckum's Cross Roads, October 26–29. Near Atlanta, November 9. March to the sea, November 15 – December 10. Between Eden and Pooler's Stations, December 9. Siege of Savannah, December 10–21. Carolinas Campaign, January to April 1865. Battle of Bentonville, North Carolina, March 19–21. Occupation of Goldsboro, March 24. Advance on Raleigh, April 9–13. Smithfield, North Carolina, April 11. Occupation of Raleigh, April 14. Bennett's House, April 26. Surrender of Johnston and his army. March to Washington, D.C., via Richmond, Virginia, April 30 – May 19. Grand Review of the Armies, May 24.

Casualties
The regiment lost a total of 166 men during service; six officers and 66 enlisted men killed or mortally wounded, two officers and 92 enlisted men died of disease.

Commanders
 Colonel Elias Peissner – killed in action at the Battle of Chancellorsville
 Colonel John Thomas Lockman
 Lieutenant Colonel Edward F. Lloyd – commanded at the Battle of Gettysburg after Col. Lockman was wounded in action on July 1

See also

 List of New York Civil War regiments
 New York in the Civil War

References

Attribution

Further reading
 Ceremonies and Addresses at the Dedication of a Monument by the 119th Regiment, N.Y. State Vols. at Gettysburg, July 3, 1888. Boston: Wright & Potter, 1889.
 Dodge, Theodore Ayrault. On Campaign with the Army of the Potomac: The Civil War Journal of Theodore Ayrault Dodge. New York: Cooper Square Press, 2001. 
 Dyer, Frederick H. A Compendium of the War of the Rebellion. Des Moines, IA: Dyer Pub. Co., 1908.
 Kotzbauer, Robert W. Elias, Ersatz Prinz, Union Patriot: A True Story. Wagontown, PA: R. W. Kotzbauer, 2004. (Biography of Col. Elias Peissner.)

External links
 119th New York Infantry monument at Gettysburg Battlefield

Military units and formations established in 1862
Military units and formations disestablished in 1865
Infantry 119